Paul Jay (born 1951) is a journalist, filmmaker, is the founder, editor-in-chief, and host of theAnalysis.news, a news analysis service. 
He was the founder, CEO and senior editor of The Real News Network (TRNN). Jay was born and raised in Toronto, Ontario and holds dual-citizenship with the United States. Jay is the nephew of screenwriter Ted Allan. A past chair of the Canadian Independent Film Caucus (now called DOC), the main organization of documentary filmmakers in Canada, Jay is the founding chair of the Hot Docs Canadian International Documentary Festival. He chaired the Hot Docs! board for its first five years.

Early life 
Jay dropped out of high school at sixteen years of age and never received any formal training in filmmaking. He became interested in the subject after attending an experimental free school, where he had the opportunity to create a short film. He gained experience by shooting sports footage for Canadian broadcast television before going on to produce his own content.

Film and television work 
Never-Endum Referendum (CTV, SRC, Arte, 1997), is a feature-length documentary, on the 1995 Quebec referendum over the question of seceding from Canada. It was called "a moving, masterful piece of film-making about a tough subject" by Tony Atherton of the Ottawa Citizen.

Jay's Hitman Hart: Wrestling with Shadows (1998), a feature-length documentary about pro wrestler Bret Hart, was screened in 25 major festivals and won more than a dozen awards. It has been called "one of the most acclaimed Canadian films in years" by eye magazine, "A tale as bizarre as Kafka and as tragic as Shakespeare" (Ottawa Citizen) and "one of the best films of 1998" (Peter Plagens, art critic for Newsweek). Hitman was produced in cooperation with the National Film Board of Canada, TVOntario, The 'A' Channel, CTV, A&E, BBC's Storyville series, and La Sept/Arte. Jay also appeared in interview segments in another Bret Hart documentary which came out in 2010, Bret Hart: Survival of the Hitman.

Lost in Las Vegas (2001) is a feature-length documentary for A&E. "Equal parts hilarious, heroic and heartfelt... often surprising, occasionally inspiring, frequently hilarious... You've got to see this thing to believe it. It's so good", wrote Rob Salem of The Toronto Star.

Return to Kandahar (2003), a feature-length documentary, was co-directed with Nelofer Pazira, star of the movie Kandahar (2001). Although Kandahar was fictional, Return to Kandahar follows Pazira's return to Afghanistan in search of her childhood friend; her first attempt inspired the fictional movie. RTK won the Donald Brittain Gemini award for best social political documentary.

Jay was the creator and executive producer of CBC Newsworld's flagship debate program counterSpin (broadcast from 1998 to 2004) for six seasons. CounterSpin was a prime time debate show about the news of the day.

Other work includes Justice Denied (Turner), The Life and Death of Owen Hart (TVO, A&E), Albanian Journey: End of an Era (TVOntario, CBC Witness), The Birth of Language (TVOntario and Discovery U.S.), Here's to the Cowboy (CBC, Disney, London Weekend, Central TV). Jay exec-produced Through Thick and Thin (CBCNewsworld), Machine Gun (3x1 Discovery Canada&US), and The Famine Within (TVO). Jay was the co-creator and co-executive producer of Face Off, a nightly prime time debate program that ran four years on CBC Newsworld.

He worked with Gore Vidal, among others, for the launch of TRNN, which included the documentary: History of the National Security State. In this, Jay interviews Vidal, as well as Lawrence Wilkerson, Ray McGovern, and Antonia Juhasz. The Real News went on to launch several internet video/television news magazines, including The Empire Files, created in 2015 with teleSUR and for which Jay is an executive producer. Jay is the executive producer of the 2017 Donald Trump, The Koch Brothers and Their War on Climate Science documentary.

Jay is the founder and host of theAnalysis.news, a video and audio current affairs interview and commentary show and website.

References

External links 
 Paul Jay on The Real News
 

1951 births
Jewish Canadian journalists
Canadian television journalists
Living people
Journalists from Toronto
Canadian documentary film directors
Film directors from Toronto
Canadian documentary film producers
Jewish Canadian filmmakers